Koigi Landscape Conservation Area is a nature park situated in Saare County, Estonia.

Its area is 2371 ha.

The protected area was designated in 2005 to protect landscapes and nature of former Pöide, Laimjala and Valjala Parish (nowadays all of them are incorporated into Saaremaa Parish).

References

Nature reserves in Estonia
Geography of Saare County